Erbessa quadricolor is a moth of the family Notodontidae first described by Francis Walker in 1856. It is found in Brazil.

References

Moths described in 1856
Notodontidae of South America